List of protected areas in Adelaide refers to protected areas proclaimed by South Australian government which are located within the Adelaide metropolitan area.

Northern Adelaide

The following protected areas are located within the South Australian government region known as Northern Adelaide.
Adelaide Dolphin Sanctuary (part)
Adelaide International Bird Sanctuary National Park—Winaityinaityi Pangkara
 Angove Conservation Park
 Anstey Hill Recreation Park
 Barker Inlet-St Kilda Aquatic Reserve
 Cobbler Creek Recreation Park
 Para Wirra Conservation Park 
 St Kilda – Chapman Creek Aquatic Reserve

Western Adelaide

The following protected areas are located within the South Australian government region known as Western Adelaide.
Adelaide Dolphin Sanctuary (part)
Fort Glanville Conservation Park
Tennyson Dunes Conservation Reserve
Torrens Island Conservation Park

Eastern Adelaide

The following protected areas are located within the South Australian government region known as Eastern Adelaide.
Black Hill Conservation Park (part)
Cleland National Park (part) 
Ferguson Conservation Park

Southern Adelaide

The following protected areas are located within the South Australian government region known as Southern Adelaide.
 Aldinga Reef Aquatic Reserve
Aldinga Scrub Conservation Park
 Belair National Park
 Blackwood Forest Recreation Park
 Brownhill Creek Recreation Park
Encounter Marine Park
 Hallett Cove Conservation Park
 Marino Conservation Park
Moana Sands Conservation Park
 Onkaparinga River National Park
Onkaparinga River Recreation Park
 O'Halloran Hill Recreation Park
 Port Noarlunga Reef Aquatic Reserve
 Scott Creek Conservation Park (part) 
 Shepherds Hill Recreation Park
 Sturt Gorge Recreation Park

See also

Protected areas of South Australia
List of Adelaide parks and gardens

References

 
Tourist attractions in Adelaide
Adelaide-related lists
Adelaide
Lists of tourist attractions in South Australia